Sphaerorrhiza is a genus of flowering plants belonging to the family Gesneriaceae.

Its native range is Brazil.

Species
Species:

Sphaerorrhiza burchellii 
Sphaerorrhiza rosulata 
Sphaerorrhiza sarmentiana 
Sphaerorrhiza serrata

References

Gesnerioideae
Gesneriaceae genera